Statistics of the V-League in the 1990 season.

First round
18 participants (chosen from 32 entrants of National A1 Football Cup 1989):

Saigon Port
Hanoi Police
Nam Dinh Textile
Angiang
Tiengiang
Haiphong Police
Dongthap
Longan
Thanhhoa Police
HCM City Customs
Vietnamese Railway
Constructional Workers
Army Club (The Cong)
Haiphong Electricity
Nghiabinh Workers
Lamdong
Quangnam-Danang
Lam River-Nghetinh

Teams were divided into 3 groups playing double round robin;
no points for more than 3 draws;
bottom clubs of each group relegated:
top-2 of each and two best 3rd placed clubs to second phase

Second round
played in 2 groups of 4, single round robin; top-2 of each to semifinals

Saigon Port finished 5th overall

Final              
Cau Lac Bo Quan doi (Ha Noi)  4-0 Quang Nam (Da Nang)

References

Vietnamese Super League seasons
1
Viet
Viet